Show Dog Nashville is an American independent record label specializing in country music artists. It was founded in 2005 by singer Toby Keith. It was later merged with Universal South Records into Show Dog-Universal Music  in December 2009 until it was re-activated in late 2015. Currently, it is distributed by Thirty Tigers.

History 
Universal South Records was started in 2001 under Universal Music Group by record producers Tony Brown and Tim DuBois. The label specialized in country music artists, including Joe Nichols, Randy Houser, Phil Vassar and Marty Stuart, as well as alternative country acts Shooter Jennings and Cross Canadian Ragweed. In 2005 it partnered with the talent show Nashville Star, offering a recording contract to Season 3 winner Erika Jo. George Canyon, another Nashville Star contestant, also recorded for the label.

Brown and DuBois stepped down from Universal South in 2006, with Mark Wright, also a record producer, taking their place as label president.

Show Dog Nashville was formed in 2005 by Toby Keith shortly after the dissolution of DreamWorks Records, the label to which he was signed at the time. DreamWorks executive Scott Borchetta was its CEO, and his own Big Machine Records label originally shared much of its staff. In March 2006, Show Dog and Big Machine split into separately staffed labels, although Keith retained his financial stake in Big Machine. Acts releasing works for Show Dog included Carter's Chord, Trailer Choir, Mica Roberts, Lindsey Haun and Martin Johnson.

In December 2009, Show Dog Records and Universal South merged to form Show Dog-Universal Music. One month later Trace Adkins left Capitol Records Nashville (which later became part of UMG's Nashville unit after UMG bought EMI in 2012) to become the first post-merger signee to the label, and the label's roster was announced. Singer-songwriter Josh Thompson, previously with Sony Music Nashville, joined the roster in September 2012. By the summer of 2015, Toby Keith and his daughter Krystal Keith had become the only artists signed to the label, but more recently Clay Walker, Waterloo Revival, and Lance Carpenter joined the label.

Acts on Show Dog Nashville
 Krystal Keith
 Toby Keith
 Kimberly Kelly
 Clay Walker

Former artists

 Trace Adkins
 Carter's Chord
 Joel Crouse
 Scotty Emerick
 Rose Falcon
 Flynnville Train
 Lindsey Haun
 JT Hodges
 Randy Houser
 Rebecca Lynn Howard
 Jessie James
 Sarah Johns
  Native Run
 Joe Nichols
 Mica Roberts
 Rushlow Harris
 Josh Thompson
 Trailer Choir
 Phil Vassar
 Waterloo Revival

Acts formerly signed to Universal South

 Baylie Brown
 Bering Strait
 George Canyon
 Kevin Costner and Modern West
 Cross Canadian Ragweed
 John Mellencamp
 Katrina Elam
 Eli Young Band
 The Elms
 Andy Gibson
 The Lost Trailers
 Regie Hamm
 Jennifer Hanson
 Randy Houser
 Matt Jenkins
 Shooter Jennings
 Erika Jo
 Holly Lamar
 Rockie Lynne
 Pat Green
 McHayes
 Dean Miller
 Allison Moorer
 Joe Nichols
 The Notorious Cherry Bombs
 Lee Roy Parnell
 Jonathan Singleton
 Sons of Sylvia
 Judson Spence
 Marty Stuart
 Phil Vassar
 Matthew West
 Amanda Wilkinson
 Holly Williams

Notes

Record labels based in Nashville, Tennessee
American country music record labels
Record labels established in 2009
American independent record labels